Joshua Mosley (born 1974 in Dallas, Texas) is an American artist and animator. He is Professor and Chair of Fine Arts in the School of Design at the University of Pennsylvania. His work is represented by Corbett vs Dempsey in Chicago. He is the recipient of the 2007 Joseph H. Hazen Rome Prize in Visual Arts and the 2005 Pew Fellowship in the Arts.

Filmography
Jeu de Paume, 2014
Natura, 2011
International, 2010
dread, 2007
A Vue, 2004
Commute, 2003
Beyrouth, 2001
Lindbergh, 1997

Exhibitions
Solo
2014 	Joshua Mosley: Jeu de Paume, The Box at Wexner Center for the Arts, Columbus, OH
2010 	Joshua Mosley: International, Donald Young Gallery, Chicago, IL
2010 	Joshua Mosley: American International, Indianapolis Museum of Art, Indianapolis, IN
2009 	Joshua Mosley: dread, Institute of Contemporary Art, Philadelphia
2009 	Joshua Mosley: A Vue, Rochester Art Center, Rochester, NY
2008 	Cerca Series: Joshua Mosley, Museum of Contemporary Art San Diego
2008	FOCUS: Joshua Mosley, Modern Art Museum of Fort Worth, Fort Worth, TX
2007 	An Evening with Joshua Mosley, Modern Mondays, screening, Museum of Modern Art, New York, NY
2007	Joshua Mosley, dread, Donald Young Gallery, Chicago, IL
2005 	Joshua Mosley, Commute, New Media Wall, Tufts University Art Gallery, Medford, MA
2004 	Joshua Mosley, A Vue, Donald Young Gallery, Chicago, IL
2003	Animate Me No 1-3, Joshua Mosley, Museum für Gegenwartskunst, Basel, Switzerland
2002	DYGProjects: Joshua Mosley, Beyrouth, Donald Young Gallery, Chicago, IL
2001	New Work by Joshua Mosley, Institute of Contemporary Art, Philadelphia, PA

Group
2015 	61st International Short Film Festival Oberhausen, Filmpalast Lichtburg, Oberhausen, Germany
2015 	VIS Vienna Independent Shorts 12th International Short Film Festival, Vienna, Austria
2014	Whitney Biennial, Whitney Museum of American Art, New York, NY 
2011	Close at Hand: Philadelphia Artists from the Permanent Collection, The Fabric Workshop and Museum, Philadelphia, PA
2011	Drawing room. Animated videos from the international art scene, EX3 Centre for Contemporary Art, Florence, Italy
2011	Here and Now: Prints, Drawings, and Photographs by Ten Philadelphia Artists, Philadelphia Museum of Art, Philadelphia, PA
2010	SITE Santa Fe Eighth International Biennial; The Dissolve, Site Santa Fe, Santa Fe, NM
2010	Live Cinema/Histories in Motion: Jennifer Levonian, Martha Colburn, Joshua Mosley, Philadelphia Museum of Art, Philadelphia, PA
2010	The Contemporary Figure: Anne Chu, Rodney Graham, Gary Hill, Andrew Lord, Josiah McElheny, Joshua Mosley, Bruce Nauman, Martin Puryear, Rosemarie Trockel, Rebecca Warren, Donald Young Gallery, Chicago, IL
2009	The Enlightenments, Joshua Mosley dread, Edinburgh International Festival, National Galleries of Scotland, The Dean, Edinburgh, Scotland
2009	Der Hund als Retter, Opfer und Held, Screening, Österreichisches Filmmuseum, Vienna, Austria
2008	Wild Signals. Artistic positions between symptom and analysis, group exhibition, Württembergischer Kunstverein Stuttgart, Germany
2008	Japan Image Forum, screening, Tokyo, Yokohama, Kyoto, Nagoya, Fukuoka and Niigata, Japan
2008	ArtProjx Hi Fi, screening, Anthology Film Archives NY
2007	Think with the Senses — Feel with the Mind. Art in the Present Tense, Venice Biennale, 52nd International Art Exhibition, Venice, Italy
2007	Contemporary Art and Cutting Edge: Pleasures of Collecting, Part III, Bruce Museum, Greenwich, CT
2007	Screen Deep, Australian Centre for the Moving Image, screening, organized by Artlink, Melbourne, Australia
2007	Image and Sound, Late at Tate Britain screening organized by Artprojx, London, England
2007	60th Festival Internazionale del Film Locarno, Play Forward section, Locarno, Switzerland
2007	Historias Animadas, Le Fresnoy, Studio national des arts contemporains, Tourcoing, France, Sala Rekalde, Bilbao, Spain, and Fundació "la Caixa", Barcelona, Spain
2006	Panorama Internacional de Cine Animadas, Cinema la Enana Marron, Madrid, Spain
2006	Forming Motion: künstlerische Animationsfilme, Directors Lounge, Berlin, Germany
2005 	Sesiones Animades, Museo Nacional Centro de Arte Reina Sofía, Madrid, Spain
2005 	51st International Short Film Festival Oberhausen, Filmpalast Lichtburg, Oberhausen, Germany
2005 	Sesiones Animades, Centro Atlantico De Arte Moderno, Gran Canaria, Spain
2005 	Sesiones Animades, Palacio de la Diputación in association with Animacor Festival, Córdoba, Spain
2005 	L' Alternativa, 12è Festival de Cinema Independent of Barcelona, Centre de Cultura Contemporània de Barcelona, Barcelona, Spain
2005 	9th Seoul International Animation Festival, Invited for Special Screening Program, Seoul, Korea
2004	50th International Short Film Festival Oberhausen, Filmpalast Lichtburg, Oberhausen, Germany
2003	Seriously Animated, Joshua Mosley, exhibition, Philadelphia Museum of Art, Philadelphia, PA
2003	Rodney Graham, Gary Hill, Joshua Mosley, exhibition, Donald Young Gallery, Chicago, IL
2003	Drawings: Rosemarie Trockel, Jana Sterbak, Richard Serra, Thomas Schütte, Charles Ray, Martin Puryear, Bruce Nauman, Joshua Mosley, Robert Mangold, Sol LeWitt, Rodney Graham, Anne Chu, Donald Young Gallery, Chicago, IL
2002	Art Basel Miami Beach – Art Video Lounge, Public Library Rotunda at Collins Park, Miami, FL
2002	Art Film, Art 33 Basel, screening, Stadtkino Basel, Basel, Switzerland
2002	Nuit Blanche/Nuit Vidéo, screening for the city of Paris, Paris, France
2000	Sound Video Film, exhibition; Donald Young Gallery, Chicago, IL

References

External links
Joshua Mosley Home Page
Corbett vs Dempsey
2014 Whitney Biennial 

American artists
University of Pennsylvania faculty
Living people
1974 births
Pew Fellows in the Arts